The 15267 / 15268 Raxaul–Lokmanya Tilak Terminus Antyodaya Express is an Antyodaya Express train belonging to Indian Railways East Central Zone that runs between  and  in India.

It operates as train number 15267 from Raxaul Junction to Lokmanya Tilak Terminus and as train number 15268 in the reverse direction, serving the states of  Bihar, Uttar Pradesh, Madhya Pradesh, and Maharashtra.

Till 31 August 2019, it used to run as Jan Sadharan Express. After 1 September 2019, it was converted into Antyodaya Express with LHB rakes for more comfortable journey in an unreserved train.

Coaches
The 15267 / 68 Raxaul Junction–Lokmanya Tilak Terminus Antyodaya Express has 23 general unreserved & two SLR (seating with luggage rake) coaches. It does not carry a pantry car.

As is customary with most train services in India, coach composition may be amended at the discretion of Indian Railways depending on demand.

Service

Routing

Traction
As the route is going to electrification, a Samastipur-based WDM-3D diesel locomotive pulls the train from Raxaul Junction up to  later, an electric locomotive WAP-4 pulls the train to its destination.

References

External links
12567 Antyodaya Express at India Rail Info
12568 Antyodaya Express at India Rail Info

Transport in Mumbai
Rail transport in Maharashtra
Rail transport in Madhya Pradesh
Rail transport in Uttar Pradesh
Rail transport in Bihar
Transport in Raxaul
Antyodaya Express trains
Jan Sadharan Express trains